A fitness app is an application that can be downloaded on any mobile device and used anywhere to get fit. Fitness apps are designed to help with exercise, other types of physical training, nutrition and diet, and other ways to get fit.

As of 2015, the number of health-related apps released on the two leading platforms, iPhone operating system (iOS) and Android, had reached more than 165,000. Apps can perform various functions such as allowing users to set fitness goals, tracking caloric intake, gathering workout ideas, and sharing progress on social media to facilitate healthy behavior change. They can be used as a platform to promote healthy behavior change with personalized workouts, fitness advice and nutrition plans. Fitness apps can work in conjunction with wearable devices to synchronize their health data to third-party devices for easier accessibility. Through using gamification elements and creating competition among friends and family, fitness apps can help incentive users to be more motivated. Running and workout apps allow users to run or work out to music in the form of DJ mixes that can be personalized based on the user's steps per minute, heart rate or ideal cadence thus boosting and enhancing performance during exercise.

See also
Exercise and music
List of fitness apps

References

External links 
The fitness of apps: a theory-based examination of mobile fitness app usage over 5 months Mhealth. 2nd March, 2017. PMCID:PMC5344171, PMID:28293619.

 
 
Application software